Allen Bellman (June 5, 1924 – March 9, 2020) was an American comic book artist whose career began in the Golden Age of Comic Books.

Career

As a child in New York City, Bellman became enchanted by comics when he saw a copy of Action Comics #1 and purchased it. He first began working for Timely Comics/Atlas Comics in 1942 after seeing an advertisement in the newspaper, with one of his first assignments being on early Captain America stories.

After his work in the comics industry ended, he continued to attend comic book conventions into his 90s; he moved to southern Florida and retired from the comic book industry in the 1960s. In 2007, he was awarded the Inkpot Award. In 2020, Bellman was awarded the Inkwell Awards Stacey Aragon Special Recognition Award (SASRA).

List of works

Timely Confidential: When the Golden Age of Comic Books Was Young (December 1, 2017) Allen Bellman (author), Michael J. Vassallo (editor), Audrey Parente (editor). CreateSpace Independent Publishing Platform

References

External links 

Interview with Bellman (2012)
Disney Information Station interview with Bellman (2016)
Q&A With Allen Bellman – Timely/Marvel Legendary Artist from The Huffington Post (2017)
Allen Bellman biography on Lambiek

1924 births
2020 deaths
Artists from New York City
Writers from New York City
American comics writers
American comics artists
Jewish American artists
Jewish American writers
Golden Age comics creators
20th-century American artists
20th-century American writers
21st-century American writers
Inkpot Award winners